Aaron T. Van de Vanter (February 25, 1859 – September 15, 1907) was an American politician and businessman in the state of Washington. He was the President of the Washington Central Improvement Company. He was elected as the first mayor of the city of Kent, on May 22, 1890. He also served on the town council in 1893, and was elected to the office of King county Sheriff in 1894. He served in the Washington State Senate from 1891 to 1895. He died of heart failure in 1907, as a result of a recent car accident.

References

1859 births
1907 deaths
Businesspeople from King County, Washington
Mayors of places in Washington (state)
People from Kent, Washington
Washington (state) city council members
Washington (state) sheriffs
Republican Party Washington (state) state senators
People from Sturgis, Michigan
19th-century American politicians
19th-century American businesspeople